The 2022 Plymouth City Council election took place on 5 May 2022 to elect members of Plymouth City Council in England. It coincided with local elections across the United Kingdom. The Conservative Party made gains in the previous election in 2021, resulting in the council entering no overall control with no party holding a majority of seats. Immediately following the results of the 2022 election, the council remained in no overall control. Labour and the Conservatives gained seats from independent councillors who had left their parties and exchanged seats with each other. The election saw the elections of the city's first Green Party councillor, Ian Poyser, and first trans councillor, Dylan Tippetts of the Labour Party.

Shortly after the election, five councillors who had resigned from the Conservative group under the previous council leader Nick Kelly returned to their party, giving the Conservatives an overall majority. The independent councillor George Wheeler, who had originally been elected as a Labour councllor, joined the Green Party.

Background

History 

Plymouth City Council held local elections as part of the 2022 local elections. The council elects its councillors in thirds, with a third of seats being up for election every year for three years, and no election each fourth year, to correspond with councillors' four-year terms. Councillors defending their seats in this election were previously elected in 2018. In that election, eleven Labour candidates and eight Conservative candidates were elected.

Elections in Plymouth are usually competitive between the Labour Party and the Conservative Party. The council was controlled by the Labour Party from the 2018 Plymouth City Council election until the 2021 Plymouth City Council election, when the council entered no overall control, with no party holding a majority of seats. One Labour councillor elected in 2018—Kevin Neil—was suspended from his party in the same year. Another Labour councillor, Chaz Singh, left his party in 2019. Several Conservative councillors left their group to sit as independents, including the former council leader Ian Bowyer, after two of them were suspended by the group leader Nick Kelly for publishing a press release supporting a reduction in the speed limit on the A38 road through the city.

Developments since 2021 
The Conservatives made gains in the 2021 Plymouth City Council election and Nick Kelly was voted in as council leader with a minority of seats. In October 2021, the Conservative councillor Shannon Burden left the Conservative group to sit as an independent. In November 2021, the Conservative councillor Nigel Churchill left his party to sit as an independent councillor after he said complaints about breaches of the code of conduct were not being properly investigated. In the same month, Kelly was suspended from the Conservative Party over an interview about the murder of Bobbi-Anne McLeod in which he had said "everybody has a responsibility not to try to put themselves in a compromising position", which was characterised as victim blaming by women politicians in the city. In January 2022, another Conservative councillor, Stephen Hulme, left the Conservative group to sit as an independent. Kelly's suspension was lifted in the same month. In February 2022, another Conservative councillor, David Downie, was suspended from the group, leading to the Conservatives and Labour each having the same number of seats on the council.

Kelly's budget failed to pass in February, with a Labour amendment passing instead that froze council tax. Labour called a vote of no confidence in Kelly. A Conservative councillor told the Plymouth Herald that some group members might abstain in the vote. Kelly lost the vote, with 29 councillors voting no confidence, 23 voting confidence and one abstaining. Independent councillors were split, with Singh supporting Kelly in the debate. Two Conservative candidates were nominated to replace him: Vivien Pengelly, a former council leader, and Richard Bingley. Bingley was elected council leader with 26 votes to Pengelly's 12, with the remaining councillors abstaining. Bingley had previously been in the Labour Party and the UK Independence Party.

Later in March, the lord mayor of Plymouth, the Conservative councillor Terri Beer, resigned from the Conservative group and the Conservative Party to sit as an independent councillor in response to Bingley's election, calling his new cabinet "lacking in experience and ability" and that her party locally had "been run into the ground by unelected chairpersons not from South West Devon". She accused the new leadership of bullying. Her resignation meant that the Labour group had more councillors than the Conservatives.

Campaign 
The Conservative councillor David Downie was blocked from seeking selection by his local party in early 2022. He was suspended from the Conservative Party after questioning the decision, and later resigned his party membership after Richard Bingley became council leader. He said that the new cabinet had too many new councillors and he was "very concerned for the city, for the lack of experience and knowledge". In March 2022, he announced that he would run in Budshead as an independent candidate.

Plymouth Labour published their manifesto on 30 March 2022. They pledged to cancel plans to remove bus shelters, invest money in roads and pavements, build more homes and buy empty properties.

In April, recordings were published of a conversation between Bingley and the independent candidate Danny Bamping that had taken place in February. Bingley was recorded saying the then council leader Nick Kelly was a "weak, two-faced git" who had "been caught crossing me big time", and predicting that he would shortly no longer be council leader. He compared the Conservative councillor Maddi Bridgman to Izzat Ibrahim al-Douri, who served as vice president to Saddam Hussein, and said that the independent councillor Chaz Singh, who had supported Kelly, "needs to quickly shift his alliance". Kelly said he was "disappointed, appalled, and shocked". Bridgeman said she was "devastated by the vitriolic attack", and called for Bingley to resign, as well as asking their Conservative Association to suspend his membership. Margaret Boadella, the Conservative Association chair, said that people upset at Bingley's remarks should "do what I did when Downie was ranting at me, shut up and grow up".

Plymouth Live reported that Bingley had appeared in a YouTube video in June 2020 in which he said people shouldn't "worry too much about climate change in itself", that people should cycle less, and that the COVID-19 pandemic was a "mildly severe flu pandemic". In response to the report, he said that he had taken action against climate change since becoming council leader, and that his comments about COVID had been made early in the pandemic. Six councillors who had left the Conservative group to sit as independents during Kelly's leadership defended Bingley, saying that he had been smeared by "a small collective of disgruntled councillors".

Statements of persons nominated were published on 6 April listing all validly nominated candidates. In order to control a majority of seats on the council, the Conservatives would need to win twelve of the nineteen seats up for election, and Labour would need to win sixteen.

Council composition

Results

Overall 

The results saw Labour and the Conservatives level on twenty-four seats each. Each party gained seats from independent councillors who were originally elected from their parties. Dave Downie, originally a Conservative, was the only independent councillor to contest his former seat, Budshead, where he was beaten by the Conservative candidate. The Conservatives gained Southway from Labour, while Labour gained Compton from the Conservatives for the first time ever. The Green Party won their first ever seat on the council, with their candidate Ian Poyser gaining Plympton Chaddlewood from the Conservatives. Dylan Tippetts, the new Labour councillor for Compton, became the first trans councillor for the city.

All changes are relative to the previous time these seats were up in the 2018 election.

Budshead 
Downie was previously elected as the Conservative candidate.

Compton

Devonport

Drake

Efford and Lipson

Eggbuckland 
The incumbent councillor, Ian Bowyer, was elected as a Conservative in 2018 but later sat as an independent.

Ham 
Tuohy previously served as councillor for Ham, losing her seat in the 2021 election.

Honicknowle

Moor View

Peverell

Plympton Chaddlewood

Plympton St Mary

Plymstock Dunstone

Plymstock Radford

Southway

St Budeaux

St Peter and the Waterfront

Stoke 
The previous councillor, Kevin Neil, was elected as Labour in 2018 but sat as an independent after being suspended from his party.

Sutton and Mount Gould

Aftermath 

The council remained in no overall control. The Labour group leader and former council leader Tudor Evans said Labour had performed "better than anticipated" and that people "want the Tories gone". Ian Poyser, elected as the city's first Green Party councillor, said he wouldn't "any pacts or allegiances to either of those other two parties at this stage", referring to Labour and the Conservatives, saying he would try to enable "cross-party working in the background". The independent councillor George Wheeler, who had originally been elected as a Labour candidate, joined the Green Party later in May. Wheeler said he had left the Labour group, and later the Labour Party, because he "could no longer work with Plymouth's Labour leadership". The Plymouth Herald reported that Bingley was planning to invite independent councillors who had left the Conservative group to rejoin. One Conservative councillor, Dan Collins for Plympton Chaddlewood, and one former Conservative independent councillor, Shannon Burden, continued to serve as councillors despite having moved to Gloucestershire. The independent councillors Lynda Bowyer, Shannon Burden, Nigel Churchill, Stephen Hulme and Kathy Watkin rejoined the Conservative group on 17 May, meaning that the Conservative Party held a majority of seats on the council.

References 

Plymouth City Council election
Plymouth City Council elections
2020s in Devon